Denkmäler aus Ägypten und Äthiopien (literally "Monuments from Egypt and Ethiopia", where "Ethiopia" was then a synonym for Nubia) is a monumental work by Karl Richard Lepsius published in Prussia in the years 1849 - 1859. Like the French Description de l'Égypte, published forty years previously, the work is still regularly consulted by Egyptologists today.

It records the scientific documentation obtained by Lepsius's Prussian expedition to Egypt and Nubia from the years 1842 - 1845 in order to gather knowledge about the local monuments of ancient Egyptian civilization. This expedition was modelled after the earlier Napoléonic mission, and consisted of surveyors, draftsmen, and other specialists. The mission reached Giza in November 1842 and spent six months making some of the first scientific studies of the pyramids of Giza, Abusir, Saqqara, and Dahshur. They discovered 67 pyramids, recorded in the pioneering Lepsius list of pyramids, and more than 130 tombs. During the mission, the Prussian team collected around 15,000 objects and plaster casts, which today form the core of the collection of the Egyptian Museum of Berlin.

The work was published in twelve large-format volumes, later supplemented by five volumes of notes. It contains highly accurate maps for its time, as well as nearly 900 plates of monuments and copies of inscriptions.

Contents
Abtheilung I Topographie Und Architektur (Section I :Topography And Architecture)
Vol. I: Blatt I-LXVI 
Vol. II: Blatt LXVII-CXLV 

Abtheilung II Denkmaeler Des Alten Reichs (Section II: Monuments Of The Old Kingdom)
Vol. III: Blatt I-LXXXI
Vol. IV: Blatt LXXXII-CLIII

Abtheilung III Denkmaeler Des Neuen Reichs (Section III: Monuments Of The New Kingdom)
Vol. V: Blatt I-XC
Vol. VI: Blatt XCI-CLXXII
Vol. VII: Blatt CLXXIII-CCXLII
Vol. VIII: Blatt CCXLIII-CCCIV

Abtheilung IV Denkmaeler Aus Der Zeit Der Grichischen und Roemischen Herrschaft (Section IV Monuments from the Period of Greek and Roman Domination)
Vol. IX: Blatt I-XC

Abtheilung V Aethiopische Denkmaeler (Section V Ethiopian Monuments)
Vol. X: Blatt I-LXXV

Abtheilung VI Inschriften Mit Ausschluss Der Hieroglyphischen (Section VI: Inscriptions Excluding Hieroglyphic Sheets)
Vol. XI: Blatt I-LXIX
Vol. XII: Blatt LXX-CXXVII

See also
 Lepsius list of pyramids
 Lepsius Standard Alphabet

References

External links 
 Full text

Ancient Egypt